The first known St Kilda Soccer Club was an association football (soccer) club based in the Melbourne suburb of St Kilda. The club was founded in late 1908 and competed in the inaugural first tier league season of the Victorian soccer system in 1909, finishing second. In its existence, the club accumulated fifteen achievements within the state's tier one and tier two leagues, and the Dockerty Cup. The year of 1923 would see the club at its peak in finishing first on the ladder of the tier one league, then known as 'Metropolitan League Division One', winning the finals series grand final against league runners-up Footscray Thistle, and winning the Dockerty Cup twice.

Off the field, little is known about the club itself other than a handful of recorded home games were played at the former Middle Park ground in the neighboring suburb of Albert Park. A photograph from 1909 shows the team wearing a dark blue shirt, white shorts and dark blue socks. The club folded prior to the commencement of the 1935  season alongside fellow tier one winner Windsor and several other clubs. This club also has no connection to either of the two clubs of the same name that followed in 1984–1991 and the present club founded in 2011, currently competing in the Victorian State League Division 1 (tier four).

Season by season history
The following list is the season-by-season history of the club.

Honours

Victorian First Tier Finals
Champions (2): 1920 (Conference A), 1923
Runners-up (1): 1915 (Conference B)
Victorian First Tier
Premiers (2): 1920, 1923
Runners-up (3): 1909, 1910, 1924

Victorian Second Tier
Premiers (1): 1933
Dockerty Cup
Winners (2): 1911, 1923
Runners-up (5): 1909, 1913, 1926, 1929, 1932

References

Soccer clubs in Melbourne
Association football clubs established in 1908
1908 establishments in Australia
Victorian State League teams
Victorian Premier League teams
1934 disestablishments in Australia
Association football clubs disestablished in 1934
Soccer Club 1908-1934
Defunct soccer clubs in Australia